Chen Xiaoguang (born ) is a Chinese male politician, who is currently the vice chair of the National Committee of the Chinese People's Political Consultative Conference.

References

External links 

1955 births
Living people

Chinese People's Political Consultative Conference